The Bayero University Kano (BUK) is a university situated in Kano, Kano State, Nigeria. It was founded in 1975, when it was renamed from Bayero University College and upgraded from University College to University. It is the first university in Kano State, North-western Nigeria.

History
Bayero University initially was Ahmadu Bello College. The college was named after the Premier of Northern Nigeria, Ahmadu Bello. It was founded in January 1960 by the Northern Nigeria Ministry of Education headed by Isa Kaita to prepare senior secondary certificate holders for General Certificate of Education (G.C.E.) and A-level in Arabic, Hausa, Islamic History, Islamic studies and English Literature.  Upon the establishment of Ahmadu Bello University in Zaria, Kaduna State, Ahmadu Bello College was renamed to Abdullahi Bayero College, after Abdullahi Bayero, Emir of Kano and soon thereafter it became a faculty of the new university.

Initially located on the grounds of the School of Arabic Studies near the palace of the Emir, the college moved to a location at the old Kano Airport Hotel, where it remained until March 1968, when it moved to Western Kano to make way for a military hospital (the Nigerian Civil War having started the previous year). The first students began their studies in February 1964, and they graduated in July 1966.

In 1975, the college became a university college, and was renamed Bayero University College, with Mahmud Tukur as principal. In 1977, it was given university status as Bayero University, with Tukur as vice-chancellor. In 1980, the university ceased functioning as a faculty of Ahmadu Bello University in Zaria.

Academic sections
The academic sections in Bayero University consist of colleges, faculties, centres, institutes and schools.

The two colleges in the university are:
 Colleges of Health Science
 Colleges of Natural and Pharmaceutical Sciences

The eleven faculties in Bayero University are:
 Arts and Islamic Studies
 Agricultural Sciences
 Computer Science and Information Technology
 Communication
Engineering
Earth and Environmental Sciences
Education
Law
Management Sciences
Social Sciences
Veterinary Medicine
The research centres include:  Centre for Advanced Medical Research,  Centre for Infectious Diseases, African Centre for Excellence in Population Health and Policy,  Centre for Gender Studies,  Centre for Islamic Civilisation and Inter-faith Dialogue, Centre for Dryland Agriculture, Centre for Biotechnology Research, Centre for Renewable Energy and Centre for Research in Nigerian Languages, Translation and Folklore Centre for Information Technology, among others. The university also houses the International Institute of Islamic Banking and Finance (IIIBF), the only one of its kind in the country.

The main campus of the university is located approximately 12.8 kilometers (roughly 8 miles) from the city along the Kano-Gwarzo Road i.e. along Janguza road. There is another site (Old Campus) at BUK Road.

Library 
The university Library was established in 1964 in order to support the university in achieving its goals of teaching, learning and research. The library acquires, processes, preserves, organises and disseminates information resources in printed and electronic format. It is a modern Library with modern technology that enables easy access to information resources by staff and students. The Library strives to meet the information need of both staff, students and researchers by designing selective dissemination of information in forms of alerts services. It also subscribes to electronics databases of international standards which give s users access to information resources irrespective of location, time and place.

List of leaders

SAS Principal (and director of college section)
 Aliyu Abubakar Dr. Aliyu Abubakar was born in Nafada in the present Gombe State in the year 1909. He attended University of London where he studied a bachelor of art degree in English language. After serving as a principal at the school of Arabic studies Kano, he also served as the first commissioner of Education in Bauchi State after its creation in 1976. He died in November 1987.

Provost of Abdullahi Bayero College
 Abdalla Eltayeb (1964–1966)
 Hamidu Alkali (September 1966 – November 1969)
 Shehu Galadanci (1969–1975)

Principal of Bayero University College
 Mahmud Tukur (September 1975 – 1977)

Vice chancellor
 Mahmud Tukur (1975 – October 1977)
 J. O. C. Ezeilo (1977–1978)
 Ibrahim H. Umar (1979–1986)
 Dandatti Abdulkadir (1986–1990)
 M. Sani Zakraddeen (1990–1995)
 Bello Bako Dambatta (1995–1999)
 Musa Abdullahi (August 1999 – 2004)
 Attahiru Muhammad Jega (September 2004 – 2010)
 Abubakar Adamu Rasheed (June 2010 – 17 August 2015)
 Muhammad Yahuza Bello (Tuesday 18 August 2015 –  17 August 2020 )
 Sagir Adamu Abbas ( 17 August 2020 – Present )

People

Notable alumni

 Ahmed Adamu petroleum economist and lecturer
 Mansur Dan Ali, Minister of Defence
 Mohammed Mabdul, Nigerian diplomat and former ambassador to Algeria.
 Zaynab Alkali, author
 Zuwaira Gambo commissioner of women affairs' and poverty development, Borno state
 Abba Gumel, Professor of Mathematics, Arizona State University
 Mukhtar Shehu Idris, politician, Governor-elect of Zamfara State 
 Farooq Kperogi, author, columnist, journalism professor at Kennesaw State University
 Farouk Lawan, politician
 Saleh Mamman, Nigerian minister of power
 Moses Ochonu, historian, author
 Rabia Salihu Sa'id, physicist
 Ibrahim Sheme, novelist, journalist, publisher
 Yushau Shuaib, author
 Jamilah Tangaza, journalist, former head of BBC Hausa
 Ahmad Sani Yerima, former governor, Zamfara State
Jumai Bello, managing director Bauchi Radio Corporation
Abdurrahman Abba SheShe chief medical director Aminu Kano Teaching Hospital

Notable faculty

 Abdalla Uba Adamu
 Stewart Brown
 Abdul Haleem Chishti
 Reginald Cline-Cole
 Bello Bako Dambatta
 Hafsat Ganduje
 Abdulrazak Gurnah, Nobel Prize in Literature 2021
 Mukhtar Atiku Kurawa

Holders of honorary degrees

 Yayale Ahmed
 Abdullahi Bayero
 Theophilus Danjuma
 Muammar Gaddafi
 Nelson Mandela
 Murtala Mohammed
 Yusuf Maitama Sule

Affiliated colleges
 Sa'adatu Rimi College of Education
 Jigawa State College of Education
 Bayero University Kano Admission Updates

References

External links

 Bayero University website

 
Educational institutions established in 1977
Federal universities of Nigeria
1977 establishments in Nigeria
Universities and colleges in Kano State
Education in Kano
Buildings and structures in Kano
Academic libraries in Nigeria